Laurie Khan (born 14 June 1943) is a Jamaican sprinter. He competed in the men's 400 metres at the 1964 Summer Olympics. He won a gold medal in the 1962 British Empire and Commonwealth Games 4 x 440 yards relay.

References

1943 births
Living people
Athletes (track and field) at the 1964 Summer Olympics
Jamaican male sprinters
Olympic athletes of Jamaica
Athletes (track and field) at the 1962 British Empire and Commonwealth Games
Athletes (track and field) at the 1966 British Empire and Commonwealth Games
Commonwealth Games gold medallists for Jamaica
Commonwealth Games medallists in athletics
Place of birth missing (living people)
20th-century Jamaican people
Medallists at the 1962 British Empire and Commonwealth Games